NGC 6791 is an open star cluster in the Lyra constellation. It was discovered by Friedrich August Theodor Winnecke in 1853. At roughly 8 billion years old, and with an iron to hydrogen abundance ratio that is more than twice that of the Sun, it is one of the oldest and most metal-rich clusters in the Milky Way. This is contrary to the typical rule-of-thumb where older means more metal-poor. Compounded with the fact that it has an unusually high population of stars, NGC 6791 is among the most studied clusters in the sky.

Age studies
Among the dimmest stars in the cluster are groups of white dwarfs that are 6 billion years old and another group that appear to be 4 billion years old. The ages are out of sync with those of the cluster's normal stars, which are 8 billion years old. This seeming contradiction in age for this cluster has been studied and a solution proposed with age of about 8 billion years.

The Kepler Mission

In March 2009 NASA launched the Kepler Mission spacecraft. This spacecraft was a dedicated mission to discover extrasolar planets by the transit method from solar orbit. In April 2009 the project released the first light images from the spacecraft and NGC 6791 was one of two objects highlighted.

The planet hosting star Kepler-19, discovered from Kepler data, is located approximately 5 arcminutes northwest of NGC 6791. The star has a differing proper motion to the cluster and is also much closer, so it is unrelated.

Notes
 Note a: The images are rotated counterclockwise approximately 130° from the detector orientation against the sky.

References

External links

 What's My Age? Mystery Star Cluster has 3 Different Birthdays
 
 NGC 6791 - LRGB image based on two hours total exposure
 

Lyra (constellation)
6791
Open clusters